Gastone Ventura (29 October 1907 - 28 July 1981), also known with his Initiatic name Aldebaran, was the Grand Master of the Italian Ordine Martinista (1967 – 1981) and Sovereign Grand Hierophant General of the Rites of Misraïm and Memphis – zenith of Venice. He was also member of the Supreme Council of the French Ordre Martiniste and Regent of the Grand Priory of Italy of the Supernus Ordo Equester Templi (Templar Order).

Biography 
Born in Treviso, Italy,  on the 29 October 1907 at 5:30am, Count Gastone Ventura descended from an aristocratic family of Parma, which during Napoleonic times took up residence in Venice and there he spent most of his life.

He was a Vice-Admiral of the Italian Navy involved in the Second World War.

A prolific author, he performed historical and esoteric research and published fundamental texts, referring to the Rite of Misraïm and Memphis, as well as the Ordine Martinista [Martinist Order] over which he presided. According to him, Traditional Gnosis is based on the universal principles of metaphysics.

Books 
Beside having translated into Italian some works of the well-known esotericist Jean Mallinger, Gastone Ventura wrote the following books (in Italian):

 Templari e Templarismo
 Cagliostro, un uomo del suo tempo
 I riti massonici di Misraïm e Memphis
 Miti e riti nel pensiero tradizionale
 Tutti gli uomini del martinismo
 Il mistero del rito sacrificale
 La terra delle quattro giustizie
 Agartha e Sambhala e la Glazialkosmogonie
 Considerazioni storico tradizionali sul mito della Regnia di Saba
 Il mondo alla rovescia
 Influenza delle dottrine dell'Antico Egitto sull'esoterismo ebraico-cristiano
 La Tetraktis pitagorica
 Note storiche sul Martinismo
 Tecniche della Via Cardiaca

References 

1907 births
1981 deaths
20th-century Italian people
Metaphysicians